The Red River Exhibition (or "The Ex" for short and historically as Manisphere) is a ten-day festival hosted every summer, in June, in Winnipeg, Manitoba. The event takes place at Exhibition Park and features a midway, concerts, stage shows, and agricultural exhibits. The park is operated by the Red River Exhibition Association, a not-for-profit organization. Winnipeg's The Guess Who played there in 2015, and the Crash Test Dummies played there in 1992.

The Ex was started in 1952 at the Osborne Stadium complex near the Manitoba Legislative Building. It later moved to the Polo Park Race Track and then to the Winnipeg Stadium, Winnipeg Arena, and Winnipeg Velodrome facilities.

In 1997, it moved to its present location. The total amount of land owned at the western edge of Winnipeg . Red River Exhibition Park was built as a multi-purpose facility on only 90 of those acres leaving almost  for future growth and expansion.

The annual fair continues to grow despite the fact its arrival is frequently accompanied by significant amounts of rain, (seven days out of ten in 2014). The record for attendance at the Ex is 223,183 paid visitors, set in 2011.

https://www.mediafire.com/view/sxatm31di3s7c5m

See also
Other Canadian annual fairs
 Canadian National Exhibition - Toronto
 Calgary Stampede - Calgary
 Edmonton K-Days - Edmonton
 Pacific National Exhibition - Vancouver
 Central Canada Exhibition - Ottawa
 Canadian Lakehead Exhibition - Thunder Bay
 Markham Fair - Markham, Ontario
 Royal Agricultural Winter Fair - Toronto
 Royal Manitoba Winter Fair - Brandon, Manitoba
 Schomberg Fair - Schomberg, Ontario
 Sooke Fall Fair - Sooke, British Columbia
 Streetsville Bread and Honey Festival - Mississauga
 Western Fair - London, Ontario

References

External links
Red River Exhibition

Culture of Winnipeg
Exhibitions in Canada
1952 establishments in Manitoba
Recurring events established in 1952
Annual events in Canada
Festivals established in 1952
Summer events in Canada
Tourist attractions in Winnipeg
Annual events in Winnipeg